Li Junyi may refer to:

Lee Chun-yi (born 1965), Taiwanese politician
Lee Chun-yee (born 1959), Taiwanese politician
Junyi Li, American electrical engineer